Flamenco  is a 1995 Spanish  documentary film  directed by Carlos Saura with camerawork by cinematographer Vittorio Storaro. The film is entirely musical and dancing vignettes, composed and photographed on a sound stage.

Synopsis
Flamenco is a documentary that includes performances from some of the best flamenco singers, dancers and guitarists. With the masterful cinematography of the Oscar winning director of photography Vittorio Storaro, director Carlos Saura brings with this film the "Light of Flamenco to the World".

As a hall fills with performers, a narrator says that flamenco came from Andalucia, a mix of Greek psalms, Mozarabic dirges, Castillian ballads, Jewish laments, Gregorian chants, African rhythms, and Iranian and Romany melodies. The film presents thirteen rhythms of flamenco, each with song, guitar, and dance: the up-tempo bulerías, a brooding farruca, an anguished martinete, and a satiric fandango de Huelva. There are tangos, a taranta, alegrías, siguiriyas, soleás, a guajira of patrician women, a petenera about a sentence to death, villancicos, and a final rumba. Families present numbers, both festive and fierce. The camera and the other performers are the only audience.

This film shows a world of flamenco—singing, dancing and guitar playing melded into an intense, enclosing and dramatic space. Song, guitar and dance are blended in  inventive ways. They are performed sometimes a cappella, extending the guitar playing in subtle and intense "solos" accompanied often by hand-clapping or knuckles rapped on a table. These dancers have learned the technique but they make the flamenco their own. Here we see children dancing with their parents; and grandparents demonstrating that flamenco imbues the spirit with a graceful power that does not age.  At the end, we see the form of flamenco symbolically passed through a class of aspiring dancers.

Cast
Performances by: Paco de Lucía, Joaquín Cortés, Manolo Sanlúcar, Lole y Manuel, La Paquera de Jerez, Fernanda de Utrera, José Menese, Enrique Morente, José Mercé, Farruco y Farruquito, Ketama, Manzanita, Maria Pagès and many others at the old Seville train station.

DVD release
Flamenco  was issued on DVD by New Yorker Video in December 2003, in Spanish with English subtitles. The  lyrics of the songs are translated in the subtitles (the only "dialog" in the film).

See also
Flamenco at 5:15, a 1983 Oscar-winning documentary about flamenco

References

External links
 

1995 films
Spanish documentary films
Films directed by Carlos Saura
1995 documentary films
Documentary films about flamenco
1990s dance films
1990s Spanish films